Kupinečki Kraljevec is a village in Central Croatia, located south of Zagreb. The population is 1,957 (census 2011).

References

Populated places in the City of Zagreb